The University of Life Sciences in Poznań (literally "University of Nature in Poznań") is a higher-education institution in Poznań, Poland. It officially gained university status on 11 April 2008. Its previous name was Akademia Rolnicza im. Augusta Cieszkowskiego w Poznaniu, literally "August Cieszkowski Agricultural Academy in Poznań", although it styled itself in English as "The August Cieszkowski Agricultural University of Poznań".

The institution was established in 1951 from Agriculture and Forestry faculties which had existed since 1919 at Adam Mickiewicz University.

The university has faculties of Agronomy, Forestry, Animal Breeding and Biology, Wood Technology, Horticulture, Food Science and Nutrition, Land Reclamation and Environmental Engineering, and Economics and Social Sciences.

See also
List of forestry universities and colleges
 List of universities and colleges in Poznań

References

External links

English-language university website

Universities and colleges in Poznań
Agricultural universities and colleges in Poland
Educational institutions established in 1951
1951 establishments in Poland